Prerna Gupta is an American serial entrepreneur focused on consumer entertainment. She currently is the CEO of Telepathic Inc., which developed the smartphone app Hooked. She cofounded several startups focused on music, dating, and short-stories. In 2011, she was named one of the most influential women in technology by the magazine Fast Company.

Early life and education

Prerna Gupta was born c. 1981/1982 to Dr. Sudhir and Shikha Gupta, in Shawnee, Oklahoma. Her parents were Indian-American immigrants.

In 1999, Gupta won the title of Miss Asia Oklahoma at a beauty pageant. She also was mistress of ceremonies at Brad Henry's inauguration as governor of Oklahoma in 2003; she had met his wife, Kim Henry, in one of her high school history classes. Gupta graduated with a degree in economics from Stanford in 2004, earning the Phi Beta Kappa honor.

Career

Gupta's first job out of college was at the Monitor Group in San Francisco, a strategy consulting practice. In 2006, she and her husband moved to Atlanta, Georgia and created a dating site for young Indians called Yaari. Gupta grew the site to two million users, before moving on her second venture.

In 2009, Gupta and her husband started an app company called Khush, which developed an iPhone app called LaDiDa that creates background music to a user's singing. It became one of the most downloaded free music apps. The company also developed the app Songify. Khush was acquired by Smule in December 2011. After the acquisition, Gupta became the Chief Product Officer at Smule, staying there until 2013. She also became involved in angel investing.

After leaving Smule, Gupta went on a road trip and started writing a book, fiction piece that took place in a futuristic Silicon Valley. Abandoning the book, she and her husband created Telepathic Inc. and an app called Hooked, where users share 1,000-word pieces of fiction. By 2017, Hooked was one of the most popular apps on the iTunes store. In 2018, the company released its first feature-length story.

Personal life
Gupta married her husband Parag Chordia on March 16, 2009. She lives in San Francisco, California.

References

External links
Official website

American women business executives
American business executives
Stanford University alumni
Angel investors
Businesspeople from the San Francisco Bay Area
People from Los Altos Hills, California
Living people
People from Shawnee, Oklahoma
Year of birth missing (living people)
1980s births
21st-century American women